The Comedian's Child (German:Das Komödiantenkind) is a 1923 German silent film directed by Fred Sauer and starring Harry Hardt, Robert Leffler and Grete Reinwald.

Cast
 Harry Hardt
 Robert Leffler 
 Grete Reinwald
 Frick Sievers
 Philipp Manning
 Gustav Trautschold

References

Bibliography
 Grange, William. Cultural Chronicle of the Weimar Republic. Scarecrow Press, 2008.

External links

1923 films
Films of the Weimar Republic
Films directed by Fred Sauer
German silent feature films
UFA GmbH films
German black-and-white films